The Mayhew, formerly the Mayhew Animal Home & Humane Education Centre is a charity in England that promotes animal welfare. It was established in 1886 and is now is one of the busiest animal sanctuaries in London, rescuing hundreds of animals each year.  

While involved with the Royal Family, Meghan Markle served as the charity's patron.

References

External links

Animal welfare organisations based in London
Organizations established in 1886
Animal rescue groups
Charities based in England